is a city located in Ibaraki Prefecture, Japan. , the city had an estimated population of 154,663 in 64,900 households and a population density of 1547 persons per km2. The percentage of the population aged over 65 was 26.1%. It is a "hiragana city", the place name is written with the hiragana syllabary and not the traditional kanji.

Geography
Hitachinaka is located slightly northeast of central Ibaraki Prefecture and east of the capital of Mito. It consists of a lowland area around the Naka River in the south and the Pacific coast in the east.

Surrounding municipalities
Ibaraki Prefecture
Tōkai
 Naka
 Mito
 Ōarai

Climate
Hitachinaka has a Humid continental climate (Köppen Cfa) characterized by warm summers and cold winters with light snowfall.  The average annual temperature in Hitachinaka is 13.8 °C. The average annual rainfall is 1415 mm with September as the wettest month. The temperatures are highest on average in August, at around 25.2 °C, and lowest in January, at around 3.4 °C.

Demographics
Per Japanese census data, the population of Hitachinaka has recently plateaued after a long period of growth.

History
The towns of Hiraiso and Minato, as well as the village of Katsuta, were created within Naka District with the establishment of the modern municipalities system on April 1, 1889. Minato was renamed Nakaminato in 1938. Nakaminato had the commercial fishing industry as its main industry, but the area rapidly developed into a company town of Hitachi, Katsuta was elevated to town status in 1940. During World War II, the area was subject to air raids and shelling by Allied warships due to its numerous factories producing war-related materials.  On March 31, 1954, the towns of Nakaminato and Hiraiso merged, forming the city of Nakaminato. Katsuta was raised to city status on November 1 of the same year. The two cities merged on November 1, 1994, to form the city of Hitachinaka.

Government
Hitachinaka has a mayor-council form of government with a directly elected mayor and a unicameral city council of 25 members. Hitachinaka contributes three members to the Ibaraki Prefectural Assembly. In terms of national politics, the city is part of Ibaraki's 4th district of the lower house of the Diet of Japan.

Economy
Hitachinaka is a bustling city with a diverse economy. The city's strategic location near Tokyo and its access to major transportation hubs have made it a popular destination for businesses and investors. It developed primarily as a company town for Hitachi group factories, and Hitachi remains the primary employer. Secondary industries include commercial fishing, agriculture and seasonal tourism.

Education
Hitachinaka has 20 public elementary schools and nine public middle schools operated by the city government, and five public high schools operated by the Ibaraki Prefectural Board of Education, including Katsuta High School. The prefecture also operates one technical institute and one special education school for the handicapped.

Transportation

Railway
Hitachinaka is connected through the Katsuta Station to the railway network with direct connections to Tokyo and Iwaki.

 JR East - Tokiwa Line 

 JR East –Jōban Line
  –  
 JR East – Suigun Line
  –  
Hitachinaka Seaside Railway – Minato Line
  –  –  –  –  –  –  –  –  –  –

Highway
 
 
 Hitachinaka Road
 Higashi-Mito Road

Local attractions
Hitachi Seaside Park
Hitachinaka City Stadium
Hitachinaka Baseball Stadium
Ajigaura Swimming Beach
Hiraiso Swimming Beach
Torazuka Kofun, National Historic Site

Annual events
 Rock in Japan Festival

Sister cities
Hitachinaka is twinned with:
 Nasushiobara, Tochigi, Japan (1990)  
 Ishinomaki, Miyagi, Japan (1996)

Notable people
Natsuo Yamaguchi, a politician
Kentaro Shiga, a professional wrestler
Ōuchiyama Heikichi, sumo wrestler

References

External links

Official Website 

Cities in Ibaraki Prefecture
Port settlements in Japan
Populated coastal places in Japan
Hitachinaka, Ibaraki